Cameron McInnes (born 1 February 1994) is an Australian professional rugby league footballer who plays as a  or  for the Cronulla-Sutherland Sharks in the NRL.

He previously played for the South Sydney Rabbitohs and St George Illawarra Dragons in the National Rugby League and at representative level for NSW City in 2017.

Background
McInnes was born in Sydney, New South Wales, Australia.

He attended Marist College Pagewood and he topped the school in the 2011 HSC for Biology, Business Studies and English. He played his junior football for the Botany Rams before being signed by the South Sydney Rabbitohs.

Career

Early career
He played for South Sydney's NYC team from 2012 to 2014 before moving on to the South Sydney New South Wales Cup team, North Sydney three rounds into 2014. He captained the NYC team in 2013 and 2014. In October 2013, McInnes re-signed with the Rabbitohs on a 2-year contract. At the end of 2013, McInnes won South Sydney's NYC Best and Fairest award, Player's Player award and was named on the interchange bench in the 2013 NYC Team of the Year.

2014 
In Round 5 of the 2014 NRL season, McInnes made his NRL debut for South Sydney against the St. George Illawarra Dragons. In Round 11, McInnes scored his first ever NRL try (against the Cronulla-Sutherland Sharks), slicing through defenders 10m out to plant the ball the down.

2015 
McInnes was selected twelve times in 2015, playing off the bench, at Hooker and even at times in the back-row. In Round 11, McInnes scored the winning try against the Parramatta Eels, latching onto a pass from fellow hooker, Issac Luke, before diving over the try-line. On 13 May 2015, McInnes re-signed with South Sydney on a two-year contract.

2016 
The departure of Isaac Luke to the New-Zealand Warriors gave McInnes the starting role for the South Sydney club. In Round One he opened the scoring, diving under the posts five minutes into South Sydney's 42–10 win over the Sydney Roosters. In Round 5, McInnes was credited with a 'stellar' performance, creating all three tries for the South Sydney club. After scoring two solo tries from dummy half, he then put , Cody Walker through a hole to score in Souths 12–16 win over the Manly-Warringah Sea Eagles.

As the season went on McInnes would switch between starting and interchange hooker, as him and South Sydney's alternate hooking option, Damien Cook fought for a starting position. By the end of the 2016 season, McInnes had played 19 games, scoring 4 tries with 1 try assist and an impressive 726 tackles. In September 2016, McInnes signed a two-year contract with the St. George Illawarra Dragons starting in 2017, after being released from the final year of his South Sydney contract following their signing of New South Wales State of Origin representative hooker Robbie Farah.

2017
In December 2017, McInnes signed a four-year deal to remain at St George Illawarra until the end of the 2021 season.

2018
In 2018, McInnes was part of the St. George Illawarra side which qualified for the finals and defeated Brisbane 48–18 in week one before being eliminated the following week by South Sydney 13–12.

2019
McInnes made a total of 23 appearances for St. George Illawarra in the 2019 NRL season as the club endured one of their worst seasons finishing in 15th place on the table just above the last placed Gold Coast.  Before the season had started, St George Illawarra were expected to reach the finals and challenge for the premiership but only managed to win 7 games all year.

2020
On 19 February, it was announced that McInnes would miss the first 12 weeks of the 2020 NRL season after suffering an MCL injury at the pre-season NRL Nines tournament. Due to the rescheduling of the season due to the COVID-19 pandemic, he managed to return in round 3.

He made a total of 18 appearances for the club in the 2020 NRL season as the side finished a disappointing 13th on the table.

2021
On 2 February, McInnes signed with Cronulla-Sutherland for four years starting in 2022. On 12 February, McInnes suffered an anterior cruciate ligament (ACL) injury, ruling him out for the rest of the season and prematurely ending his career with the club.

2022
In round 2 of the 2022 NRL season, McInnes made his club debut for Cronulla in their 18-16 victory over Parramatta.
McInnes played 25 games for Cronulla throughout the year as the club surprised many by finishing second on the table.  McInnes played in both finals matches as Cronulla were eliminated in straight sets.

Statistics

NRL

City vs Country

References

External links

St. George Illawarra Dragons profile
Dragons profile
NRL profile

1994 births
Living people
Australian rugby league players
Cronulla-Sutherland Sharks players
Junior Kangaroos players
New South Wales City Origin rugby league team players
North Sydney Bears NSW Cup players
Rugby league hookers
Rugby league players from Sydney
South Sydney Rabbitohs players
St. George Illawarra Dragons players